Francesco Forquet (25 August 1886 – 28 April 1972) was an Italian equestrian. He competed in two events at the 1928 Summer Olympics.

References

1886 births
1972 deaths
Italian male equestrians
Olympic equestrians of Italy
Equestrians at the 1928 Summer Olympics
Place of birth missing